Jesús "Chus" Ruiz Suárez (born 20 January 1997) is a Spanish footballer who plays as a goalkeeper for AD Alcorcón.

Club career
Born in Esplugues de Llobregat, Barcelona, Catalonia, Ruiz joined RCD Espanyol's youth setup in 2014, from UE Cornellà. On 25 June 2016, after finishing his formation, he returned to his previous club and was assigned to the main squad in Segunda División B.

Ruiz made his senior debut on 30 April 2017, starting in a 2–0 home win over CD Ebro. On 7 August, after being mainly used as a backup, he moved to Tercera División side UD Ibiza.

On 28 July 2018, after achieving promotion to the third level but again as a backup, Ruiz was loaned to SD Tarazona in the fourth division, for one year. He returned to Ibiza after being an undisputed starter for the club, and was transferred to RCD Mallorca on 18 July 2019; he was initially assigned to the reserves also in the fourth tier.

On 31 August 2020, Ruiz returned to Tarazona, with the club now in the third division, but left on 18 September to join AD Alcorcón, being initially a third-choice option behind Dani Jiménez and Samu Casado.

Ruiz remained a third-choice behind Jiménez and José Aurelio Suárez for the 2021–22 campaign, but on 4 February 2022, after Jiménez left for CD Leganés and Suárez moved to Tokushima Vortis, he made his professional debut by starting in a 1–3 away loss against Burgos CF in the Segunda División.

References

External links

1997 births
Living people
People from Baix Llobregat
Sportspeople from the Province of Barcelona
Spanish footballers
Footballers from Catalonia
Association football goalkeepers
Segunda División players
Segunda División B players
Tercera División players
UE Cornellà players
UD Ibiza players
SD Tarazona footballers
RCD Mallorca B players
AD Alcorcón footballers